Pseudodiphasium is a genus of lycophyte in the family Lycopodiaceae with only one species,  Pseudodiphasium volubile. In the Pteridophyte Phylogeny Group classification of 2016 (PPG I), the genus is placed in the subfamily Lycopodioideae. Some sources do not recognize the genus, sinking it into Lycopodium. Pseudodiphasium volubile is native from Peninsular Malaysia to Queensland, Australia, and has been introduced into Ecuador.

References

Lycopodiaceae
Lycophyte genera
Monotypic plant genera